A pickert is a flat, fried or baked potato dish from Westphalia, Germany. It can be considered a kind of flattened dumpling or very nourishing pancake. It comes as a round Pfannenpickert the size of a pan, a rectangular Kastenpickert, or a palm-sized regular Pickert. The name is derived from Low German picken, pecken ("to stick something onto something else").

The main ingredients are grated potatoes, flour, milk, eggs, and (usually) raisins, with a little yeast, salt and sugar, and oil for the baking. Three big potatoes produce 10–15 palm-sized pickerts, enough for 4–5 people.

Pickerts are a specialty of the district of Lippe, where they developed from a traditional meal for the poorer people. In former times, Pickert was eaten as breakfast or lunch by poor farmers, being a cheap and very nourishing dish, as would be required of food for a day's work in the fields. They are now served spread with sugar beet syrup, butter or (plum) jam, or leberwurst.

A related dish, Lappenpickert, is found in the regions west of Lippe, towards Münster and the Ruhr Area. It does not usually contain raisins and yeast, but may have a dash of sweet cream added. Lappenpickert is usually baked in rather thin pancakes on a griddle greased with a side of lard, and eaten with the same spreads as Pickerts from Lippe, or with smoked fish or cold cuts.

See also
 Rösti

References

External links 

 Recipe on FoodFamily.net
 Recipe and more information on lipperland.de - German
 Recipe on the website of the City of Detmold - German
 Recipe from Detmold-Brokhausen - German
 Recipe on lippisches.de - German
 Recipes and Stories around the Pickert on lippischer-pickert.de - German

Baked foods
Dumplings
Fried foods
Potato dishes
Westphalian cuisine